Balla Round Tower is an Irish round tower and National Monument located in County Mayo, Ireland.

Location

Balla Round Tower is located in central Balla, west of the Main Street (part of the N60) on the site of the modern graveyard.

History

A monastery was founded at Balla by Mo Chua of Balla (d. AD 637). The tower is believed to date from the 12th century, judging by the moulding on the lower jambs. The tower was used as a bell-tower in the 19th century.

Description

Balla Round Tower was built with red and brown coursed sandstone, and the lower three stories survive. There are two doorways: one in the east  up, and an arched north-facing lower down doorway – probably a later insertion. There is only one window, in the south of the tower. The lintel of the east door reused an old cross slab, and two bullaun stones are built into the base.

References

National Monuments in County Mayo
Archaeological sites in County Mayo
Towers in the Republic of Ireland